Balham and Tooting was a constituency in South London, which returned one Member of Parliament (MP)  to the House of Commons of the Parliament of the United Kingdom.  It was created for the 1918 general election and abolished for the 1950 general election.

Boundaries 
The constituency, officially the Balham and Tooting Division of the Parliamentary Borough of Wandsworth, was created by the Representation of the People Act 1918. The 1918 Act had the principal aim of reducing the growing malapportionment due to electorate growth in geographical areas coupled with the subsidiary aim of realigning constituency boundaries so as to largely correspond with units of local government units (as created in 1889 and 1900). The new seat was one of five divisions of the Metropolitan Borough of Wandsworth in the parliamentary County of London.

The seat had previously formed part of the single-member Wandsworth constituency, created in 1885.

The constituency was defined in terms of wards of the metropolitan borough as they existed in 1918: it comprised the entire Tooting ward and the part of the Balham ward which lay to the west and south of the centre of Balham Hill, Balham High Road, Ormeley Road, Cavendish Road and Emmanuel Road. The remainder of the Balham ward was in another of the Wandsworth divisions, Clapham.

The constituency was surrounded by Wandsworth Central to the north-west, Battersea South to the north, Clapham to the north-east, Streatham to the east and south-east, Mitcham to the south and Wimbledon to the west.

In the redistribution which took effect with the 1950 United Kingdom general election the Tooting ward and part of Balham ward were included in the redrawn Wandsworth Central seat. The rest of Balham ward remained in the Clapham constituency.

Members of Parliament

Election results

Elections in the 1910s

Elections in the 1920s

Elections in the 1930s

Elections in the 1940s

References 

 Boundaries of Parliamentary Constituencies 1885-1972, compiled and edited by F.W.S. Craig (Parliamentary Reference Publications 1972)

Parliamentary constituencies in London (historic)
Constituencies of the Parliament of the United Kingdom established in 1918
Constituencies of the Parliament of the United Kingdom disestablished in 1950
Politics of the London Borough of Wandsworth
Balham
Tooting